Carol Anne Handwerker is an American materials scientist. She is the Reinhardt Schuhmann, Jr. Professor of Materials Engineering and Environmental and Ecological Engineering at Purdue University. She is a fellow of both The Minerals, Metals & Materials Society and the Materials Research Society.

Early life and education 
Professor Handwerker has said that she wanted to become a scientist at the age of nine. She attended Wellesley College, earning a B.A. in Art History. After graduating, she worked for an organization investigating air and water pollution where she realized that she was interested in engineering. She eventually joined Massachusetts Institute of Technology (MIT), where she studied and worked as an analyst at the MIT computer centre. At MIT, Professor Handwerker received another undergraduate degree in materials science and ceramics. She remained at MIT for graduate studies, where she earned her Ph.D. in Ceramics studying the grain growth of magnesium oxide (MgO).

Research and career 
Professor Handwerker began her career as a postdoctoral researcher in the National Bureau of Standards (now National Institute of Standards and Technology) in 1984. She was appointed to the metallurgical processing group at National Institute of Standards and Technology in 1986. She was promoted to Group Leader in 1994 followed by Chief of the Metallurgy Division in 1996. She joined Purdue University as a professor in the Materials Engineering department in 2005

Dr. Handwerker became an expert in materials for soldering. Working with the International Electronics Manufacturing Initiative (iNEMI), she developed a lead-free solder that could be used in microelectronics.

Her current research interests include the development and application of thermodynamic and kinetic theory and experiments of phase transformation and interface motion to complex industrial and scientific problems. Her group focuses on understanding how specific microstructure can be designed in polycrystalline materials and thin films by controlled interface properties. They also are developing models for how single crystal nanowires nucleate and grow using the vapor-liquid-solid (VLS) method to improve the manufacturing and reliability of the current generation of Pb-lead solder interconnects on printer circuit boards. They are also developing new nanoparticle-based interconnect structures for next generation circuit assembly.

She joined The Minerals, Metals & Materials Society during her early career, specifically the functional materials division.

Awards and honors 
 1993 The American Ceramics Society Fellow
2008 ASM International Class of Fellows
2009 The Minerals, Metals, & Materials Society Leadership Award
2010 The Minerals, Metals & Materials Society Research to Industrial Practice Award
 2017 The Minerals, Metals & Materials Society FMD John Bardeen Award
 2018 Elected Fellow of The Minerals, Metals & Materials Society
2021 Elected Fellow of Materials Research Society
 2021 Northwestern University Morris E. Fine Lecture

Selected publications

Personal life 
Handwerker met her husband, John Blendell, while studying at Massachusetts Institute of Technology. Together they have two daughters.

References 

Living people
Purdue University faculty
American women scientists
Wellesley College alumni
Massachusetts Institute of Technology alumni
Year of birth missing (living people)
Women materials scientists and engineers
Fellows of the Minerals, Metals & Materials Society
American materials scientists
21st-century American women